Earnest Killum (June 11, 1948 – June 11, 2020) was an American professional basketball player for the Los Angeles Lakers of the National Basketball Association (NBA). After starring for Stetson from 1968 to 1970, averaging a school-record 24.9 points over two seasons and earning All-America honors, he was selected by the Lakers with the thirteenth pick (30th overall) in the second round of the 1970 NBA Draft. An ankle injury limited him to only four games, in which he averaged 0.3 points and 0.5 rebounds.

Killum departed the league after the 1970–71 season, and played the next year in Europe before retiring. He is one of only two Stetson alumni to play in the NBA, along with Lorenzo Williams, and was elected into the school's athletic Hall of Fame in 1983.

He became a vice principal at Milton High School in Alpharetta, Georgia in the early 2000s.

References 

1948 births
2020 deaths
American men's basketball players
Basketball players from Mississippi
Educators from Georgia (U.S. state)
Guards (basketball)
Junior college men's basketball players in the United States
Los Angeles Lakers draft picks
Los Angeles Lakers players
Sportspeople from Clarksdale, Mississippi
Stetson Hatters men's basketball players